This is a list of the Ministers of Infrastructure and Transport, whose office name and portfolio have undergone variations over the last decades. The current minister is Matteo Salvini, leader of the League, who has been in office since 22 October 2022.

In 2021 the Ministry was renamed Ministry of Sustainable Infrastructure and Mobility. However, it reverted to its previous name in November 2022.

List of Ministers of Infrastructures and Transports

From 1946 to 2001

Since 2001
 Parties

 Coalitions

Timeline

References

Lists of government ministers of Italy

2001 establishments in Italy